Actually is a 2014 Malayalam-language Indian feature film written and directed by Shine Kurian, starring Hemanth Menon, Aju Varghese, Sneha Unnikrishnan, Anjali Aneesh, Bhagath Manuel with veteran actors Sreenivasan and P. Balachandran in important characters.

Summary

Actually is the story of Sanu and Gopalakrishnan and their unexpected involvement in two different incidents. A group of youngsters also gets involved in the happenings. Sanu is forced to fight for his rights along with his family when he realize that his life is in tatters.

Cast

Hemanth Menon as Deepak
Aju Varghese as	Blog Kavi Saji
Sreenivasan as Sanu
Sneha Unnikrishnan as Priya
Anjali Aneesh as Roopa
Bhagath Manuel as Vinay
P. Balachandran as Gopalakrishnan
Chembil Ashokan as Shivan
Jayakrishnan as Managing Director
Lishoy as Deepak's Father

References

External links
 

2014 films
2010s Malayalam-language films
Indian romantic thriller films
2014 directorial debut films
2010s romantic thriller films